Nico Hecker (born 5 September 1991) is a German professional footballer who plays as a midfielder for Rot Weiss Ahlen.

References

1991 births
Living people
German footballers
Association football midfielders
Rot Weiss Ahlen players
SC Verl players
Regionalliga players
3. Liga players
Oberliga (football) players
Sportspeople from Chemnitz